Sean Simpson (born 16 April 1970) is a former Australian rules footballer who played for St Kilda and Geelong in the Australian Football League (AFL).

Simpson started his career at St Kilda, after being recruited from East Ballarat, but had to wait until his third season to play in a win. After being delisted he was picked up by a much stronger side in Geelong and went on to appear in 10 finals with the club, including the 1992 AFL Grand Final loss. In his first year at Geelong he gained two 'Best on Ground's at the Brownlow Medal count. He played mostly on the wing or as a tagger.

Simpson's son Sam was drafted to Geelong under the father–son rule with the fifty third pick in the 2017 rookie draft.

Notes

References

Holmesby, Russell and Main, Jim (2007). The Encyclopedia of AFL Footballers. 7th ed. Melbourne: Bas Publishing.

1970 births
Living people
Australian rules footballers from Victoria (Australia)
St Kilda Football Club players
Geelong Football Club players
East Ballarat Football Club players
Victorian State of Origin players